Lion Red is a New Zealand lager beer brewed by Lion Breweries in Auckland, part of Lion. The beer is 4.0% alcohol. Because of its relatively low alcohol content it is widely regarded as an excellent 'session' beer, that is, a beer that can be consumed freely over a long session of time without all the adverse effects of a higher alcohol volume beer. As such, it is also a favourite of university students, along with similar strength beers such as Speights and DB Draught.

History

According to the date on cans and bottles of Lion Red, the beer was established (and thus presumably first brewed) in 1907. The name Lion Red was first adopted by the public to describe the red coloured label and can. Lion Breweries responded by changing the official name from Lion Beer to Lion Red in the mid 1980s.

Sponsorship

Rugby League 
Lion Red has been a longtime sponsor of the New Zealand Rugby League team. Since their introduction into the National Rugby League competition in Australia in 1995 until 2014, the New Zealand Warriors (formerly Auckland Warriors) have also been sponsored by Lion Red. They sponsored the national Lion Red Cup from 1994-6 and currently sponsor Auckland Rugby League's Fox Memorial premier competition.

Rugby Union 
Lion Red sponsor the Northland Taniwhas and Counties-Manukau Steelers in the Mitre 10 Cup competition.

External links

Beer in New Zealand
Kirin Group